Aberdeen is a civil parish in Carleton County, New Brunswick, Canada, located in the interior east of the Saint John River. It comprises two local service districts (LSD), both of which are members of the Western Valley Regional Service Commission (WVRSC).

The Census subdivision of Aberdeen Parish shares the civil parish's borders. Revised census figures based on the 2023 local governance reforms have not been released.

Origin of name
Aberdeen, Scotland was the source of many settlers of Glassville Settlement. Also possible is that the parish was named in honour of either the Earl of Aberdeen, a former Prime Minister of the United Kingdom who died shortly before Glassville was settled, or his youngest son Arthur Hamilton-Gordon, who was Lieutenant Governor of New Brunswick when the parish was erected.

History
Aberdeen was erected in 1863 from Brighton, Kent, and Peel Parishes. Most of the parish had formed the southeastern part of Kent, with Peel and Brighton providing a strip of territory along their northern edge.

Boundaries
Aberdeen Parish is bounded:

 on the west by the western side of grants running along the Ketchum Ridge, West Glassville, Old West Glassville, Shikatehawk, and Denney Hill Roads;
 on the north by the north line of a grant on the Denney Hill Road prolonged to the York County line;
 on the east by the York County line;
 on the south by the southern line of a grant southwest of the intersection of the Black Brook and Ketchum Ridge roads, prolonged to the York County line.

Evolution of boundaries
The original boundaries of Aberdeen have changed little, unusual among Carleton County's parishes.

In 1896 the northwestern corner and northern boundary were changed to better match grant lines, taking a long narrow triangle of territory from Kent Parish while losing a few acres in the northwestern corner.

In 1956 the western boundary was altered slightly, transferring a Crown Reserved Road to Kent Parish. This may have been an error, as the same Act corrected two wording errors that dated to 1896.

Local service districts
Both LSDs assess for the basic LSD services of fire protection, police services, land use planning, emergency measures, and dog control.

Aberdeen Parish
The local service district of the parish of Aberdeen originally comprised the entire parish.

It was established 23 November 1966 to assess for fire protection. Community services were added on 20 December 1967.

Today Aberdeen additionally assesses for community & recreation services. The taxing authority is 207.00 Aberdeen.

LSD advisory committee: Yes. Chair Gailen Allan has sat on the WVRSC board since at least 2015.

Glassville
Glassville comprises an irregular area around the junction of Route 107, Route 580, and the Centre Glassville Road.

The LSD was established on 18 December 1974 to add street lighting and first aid & ambulance services.

Today Glassville additionally assesses for street lighting. The taxing authority is 223.00 Glassville.

LSD advisory committee: Yes. Chair Brent Pearson has sat on the WVRSC board since at least 2015.

Communities
Communities at least partly within the parish.

 Argyle
 Biggar Ridge
 Carlow
 Centre Glassville
 Divide
 East Glassville
 East Knowlesville
 Esdraelon
 Foreston
  Glassville
 Hayden Ridge
 Hemphill Corner
 Highlands
  Juniper
 Juniper Station
 Ketchum Ridge
  Knowlesville
 MacIntosh Mill
 North Ridge
 South Ridge
 West Glassville

Bodies of water
Bodies of water at least partly within the parish.
 Southwest Miramichi River
 Nashwaak River
 Cold Stream
 Shikatehawk Stream
 Nashwaak Lake

Other notable places
Parks, historic sites, and other noteworthy places at least partly within the parish.
 Golden Ridge Protected Natural Area
 Juniper Airport
 Mount Frederick Clarke
 Shikatehawk Stream Protected Natural Area
 Welch Brook Protected Natural Area

Demographics

Population
Population trend

Language
Mother tongue (2016)

See also
List of parishes in New Brunswick

Notes

References

Parishes of Carleton County, New Brunswick
Local service districts of Carleton County, New Brunswick